The Hustler of Muscle Beach is a 1980 American comedy television film starring Richard Hatch, Kay Lenz and Jeanette Nolan. It was directed by Jonathan Kaplan and originally aired on ABC as the ABC Friday Night Movie on May 16, 1980.

Plot
Richard Hatch stars as Nick Demec, a get-rich-quick schemer who stages a bodybuilding competition at Muscle Beach in Venice, California.  The film included performances by several professional bodybuilders, including Franco Columbu and Frank Zane, and also co-starred Kay Lenz and Jeanette Nolan.

The film was conceived as a pilot for a television series, but the concept never developed beyond this production.

Cast
Richard Hatch as Nick Demec
Kay Lenz as Jenny O'Rourke
Jeanette Nolan as Rose MacIntosh
Joe Santos	as Barry Layton
Jack Carter as Mancusco
Veronica Hamel as Sheila Dodge
Kenneth McMillan as Joseph Demec

See also
List of television films produced for American Broadcasting Company

References

External links

1980 films
1980 comedy films
1980 in bodybuilding
1980s English-language films
ABC Movie of the Week
American comedy television films
Bodybuilding films
Films directed by Jonathan Kaplan
Films set in Los Angeles
Films shot in Venice, Los Angeles
Television films as pilots
1980s American films